Adirampattinam is a newly established (Dec 2021) Municipality in the Pattukottai taluk of the Thanjavur district in the Indian state of Tamil Nadu. It is also short known by Adirai. It is the largest coastal town in the district and fourth largest town in the Thanjavur district.

Adirampattinam is the important coastal town connecting Chennai and Thoothukudi via ECR.

History 
Arab traders from Egypt and Yemen landed at the port of Korkai (the present Kayalpatnam) in the Pandia Kingdom in the year 1120 A.D. Some traders migrated here. Adirampattinam was initially called as Sellinagar then was renamed to Adirampattinam. Strong trading connections existed with Yaalpanam (Sri Lanka). There exist a strong cultural connection exists between Kayalpatnam, Adirampattinam and Kilakarai.

Recently, government upgraded Adirampattinam to municipality status.

Geography

Climate 
Being close to the equator, Adirampattinam enjoys a tropical wet and dry climate. Extreme heat prevails in the months of April and May, while mid-May is the hottest (Agni) period during a year – with temperatures regularly reaching . The northeast monsoon occurs in October and November.

Köppen-Geiger climate classification system classifies its climate as tropical savanna (Aw).

Demographics

Population 
 population census of India, Adiramapttinam has a population of 48,066 Males constitute 47.95%(14897) of the population and females 52.04%(16169). Adirampattinam has an average literacy rate of 74.21%. Children under 6 years of age make up 13.08% of the population. Islam is the major religion with 72.25% of the population being Muslim and more than 40 masjids within the town. Tamil is the official language and is predominantly spoken. The most commonly used dialects is the Central Tamil dialect.
And fourth populated largest Town in Thanjavur District.

Transport 
This town is connected via road and rail with major towns and cities in Tamil Nadu.

By Air

By Rail 
Adirampattinam Railway Station is also one of the major railway station in Tiruchirapalli Zone. Karaikudi to Tiruvarur passenger train is operating via Adirampattinam Railway Station.

By Road 
The Major port near by Adirai is Tuticorn Adirampattinam is a coastal town connecting Chennai and Thoothukudi via ECR. It is the gateway town for Delta districts from south Tamil Nadu. It is situated at a distance of 59 km from district capital Thanjavur and 356 km south of state capital Chennai. ECR link road SH-66 from Kumbakonam, meets ECR at this town. 

The East Coast Road (ECR) from Chennai to Kanyakumari connects this town as well. The major inter city bus routes from this town are to Pattukkottai, Muthupet, Thanjavur, Mannargudi, Nagapattinam, Vedaranyam, Kumbakonam, Peravurani and Pudukkottai. Long-distance buses are also operating from Adirampattinam to Chennai, Tiruchirapalli, Puducherry, Karaikal, Rameshwaram, Thiruchendur, Nagercoil, Thiruvananthapuram etc.

Omni buses are also operating from this town to Chennai, Bangalore, Coimbatore, Tiruchirapalli, Puducherry, Cuddalore, Chidambaram, Kayalpattinam, Tirunelveli, Nagercoil etc.

Adjacent communities
It is the Municipality in Tamil Nadu and fourth largest town in Thanjavur District and ninth largest town in Delta region of Tamil Nadu after Thanjavur, Kumbakonam, Nagapattinam, Mannargudi, Mayiladuthurai, Tiruvarur, Pattukkottai and Sirkazhi.

References 

Cities and towns in Thanjavur district